Premariacco is a comune (municipality) in the province of Udine in the Italian region Friuli-Venezia Giulia, located about  northwest of Trieste and about  east of Udine.

Premariacco borders the following municipalities: Buttrio, Cividale del Friuli, Corno di Rosazzo, Manzano, Moimacco, Pradamano, Remanzacco.

Paulinus II of Aquileia, the Patriarch of Aquileia and one of the most eminent scholars of the Carolingian Renaissance, was born in Premariacco around 726.

Demographic evolution

Notable people
Saint Paulinus II - born c. 730; Patriarch of Aquileia 787–802 
Fiore dei Liberi - ca. 1350–1420, medieval fencing master

Gallery

References

External links
 Official website

Cities and towns in Friuli-Venezia Giulia